Jean-Jacques Askenasy is an Israeli neurologist. He is an honorary member of the Romanian Academy.

Biography 
Askenasy received his doctorate in medicine degree cum laude from the University of Cluj in Romania 1954. Appointed instructor of neurology in his 5 ler School of Medicine. Residence of Neurology- Neurological Institute of Academy 1956. Doctor in Science  at the University C.I.Parhon Bucharest, 1969. Chairman of the dpt. of Neurology at the University Hospital CFR II Bucharest. In 1973 neurologist at Ichilov Hospital-Tel Aviv University. Researcher in Neuroscience at Weitzman Institute 1974–1975.In 1981 was appointed Associated Prof. of Neurology at Mount Sinai School of Medicine NY University, where he worked together with Prof. Melvin Yahr and Prof. Eliot Weitzman on the project Sleep in Parkinsonian patients. He subsequently was nominated Director of the Sleep Medicine Center at the Sheba Medical Center.

In this quality he organized the courses in sleep medicine at the Tel Aviv University. In 1986 he was nominated Professeur Agrege at Pierre et Marie Curie University, Clinique Charcot. In 1995 was nominated Clinical Professor of Neurology at Sackler School of Medicine TAU. Professor of Forensic Science at the Faculty of Law Bucmann, Tel Aviv University.

Askenasy is author of 13 books, 22 chapters in books, 103 original scientific articles & cas reports in the field of Neurology and Sleep Medicine, 212 active participation's in National and International congresses.

Awards 
1964- La Medaille des Journées Internationales de Grenoble - France-
1981- Honor Citizen of the City of Yeruham – Israel- 
1995- Medaille Piere Castaigne – France-
1997- Merit Certificate of the Ministry of Education of Israel 
1999- Officier de l'Ordre de Mono – Togo-
2001- Diplome d'honneur de l'AMIF – France
2003- Meritul Academiei Romane – Romania
2012- Crystal Trophy & Diploma of Excellence of Medical Life Gala 2012- Romania
2013- Decorated by the President of Romania with "Meritul Sanitar" rank "Officer"
2016- Membre d'Honneur de l'Academie Romania
2017- Comandeur de l'Ordre de Mono - Togo
2018- Membro Honorario de la Real Academia Barcelona
2018- Prize of Excellence "Augustin Buzura" -Romania
2019- Centenart Prize – Romania

References

External links 
 Official website
 

Israeli neurologists
Honorary members of the Romanian Academy
Babeș-Bolyai University alumni
Year of birth missing (living people)
Living people